Arthur A. McGiverin (November 10, 1928 – June 2, 2019) was a justice of the Iowa Supreme Court from August 15, 1978, to November 9, 2000, appointed from Wapello County, Iowa. McGiverin was born in Ottumwa, Iowa. He served in the United States Army. McGiverin received his bachelor's and law degrees from the University of Iowa. He practiced law in Ottumwa. He served as Ottumwa Municipal Court judge and as Iowa District Court judge.

References

Justices of the Iowa Supreme Court
2019 deaths
1928 births
People from Ottumwa, Iowa
University of Iowa alumni
Military personnel from Iowa
Iowa state court judges
Chief Justices of the Iowa Supreme Court
20th-century American judges